Events in the year 2019 in Greece.

Incumbents
President: Prokopis Pavlopoulos
Prime Minister: 
 Alexis Tsipras (until 9 July 2019)
 Kyriakos Mitsotakis (since 8 July 2019)

Events 

13 January - Greece Defence Minister Panos Kammenos and his Independent Greeks party quit Greece's ruling coalition on Sunday, over a deal struck on the Macedonia naming dispute. Potentially leaving the governing coalition without a workable majority in parliament.

Births

Deaths

See also

 2019 European Parliament election

References 
 

 
Greece